The Houston Gamblers were an American football team that competed in the United States Football League in 1984 and 1985. The Gamblers were coached by veteran NFL head coach Jack Pardee in both their seasons. They were noteworthy for introducing former Middletown (Ohio) High School football coach Glenn "Tiger" Ellison's Run & Shoot offense to the world of pro football.

The Run & Shoot puts the USFL on the map
Run & Shoot advocate and chief refiner Darell "Mouse" Davis was hired by the progressive Pardee to install the offense as the team's Offensive Coordinator. (Davis was a former head coach at Portland State University where he developed the St. Louis Cardinals' two-time Pro Bowl quarterback Neil Lomax.) Led by former Miami Hurricanes QB Jim Kelly (who snubbed the NFL's Buffalo Bills to play in the USFL) the Gamblers wrecked secondaries across the USFL, getting national media attention in demolishing the league's single season scoring record (The Gamblers scored 618 points in 1984.  The 1983 USFL record was 456).  Kelly became the USFL's answer to the NFL's Dan Marino, and the league's second superstar player (after Herschel Walker).

The Gamblers also got the attention of a few NFL teams. The run & shoot offense would be adopted as the base set for the Detroit Lions, Atlanta Falcons and the Houston Oilers.  All 3 teams were in the upper half of the league in scoring while using the run & shoot.  In spite of this fact, the offense was widely discredited as a gimmick in the NFL when none of the 3 teams won a Super Bowl.  Even after those teams moved away from the run & shoot as their base sets, the influence of Mouse Davis and Jim Kelly left a lasting impact on the league. In the 1970s most teams ran the 2 back "pro-set" as their base offense with fixed routes. Today, almost all NFL teams incorporate extensive packages of 4 WR sets and option routes for WRs depending on coverages faced, innovations that are the basis of the run & shoot.

The playoffs, 1985, and beyond
The Gamblers appeared in the playoffs in each of their two seasons, but suffered narrow first-round defeats both times.  In 1984, the expansion Gamblers finished the regular season with the best record in the Western conference and were the favorites in the West to go to the championship game. They held a 16–3 lead over George Allen's star laden Arizona Wranglers with just 7 minutes remaining before falling 17–16 in a furious Wrangler comeback.  The Wranglers would go on to play in the 1984 Championship Game.

Following the August 22, 1984 USFL Owners meeting where the majority of owners decided to move to the fall, things started to crumble for the league, especially for teams in cities with existing NFL teams, like the Gamblers. Kelly, one of the more public faces of the USFL, voiced the concerns of many fans when he called the schedule switch  "100 percent" wrong, saying, "It's the worst thing they could have done."

The Run N' Shoot attack of the Gamblers grew even stronger in 1985. Davis left to become head coach of the Denver Gold and was succeeded by special-teams coach John Jenkins. Jenkins' version of the Run N' Shoot brought more complexity and excitement to the Gamblers. In the first game of the season against the LA Express, down 31 - 13 with 8 minutes left in the 4th Quarter, the Gamblers became the first professional football team to use a no-huddle offense before a two-minute drill.  The no-huddle would later become Kelly's base offense with the Buffalo Bills.  The so-called "hurry-up offense" allowed the Gamblers to come back to win the game 34–33, which Sports Illustrated dubbed The Greatest Game Never Seen because it was not televised. In the first 5 games in 85, Jim Kelly had one of the hottest starts in professional football history. In Week 4, the Gamblers beat Mouse Davis's Denver Gold 36 - 17 in the first pro game to match two Run N' Shoot offenses. After this game Jim Kelly was on pace to throw for 7,434 yards and 78 touchdowns.  Kelly suffered a leg injury that sidelined him for the last six games of the season. However, if you combine Kelly's and back up quarterback Todd Dillon's stats together, they threw for a combined 6,118 yards (Professional American Football Record). The Gamblers offense also set a record for the first time ever in professional football, had 3 receivers catch over 1,000 yards in Clarence Verdin, Gerald McNeil, and Richard Johnson. The team made the playoffs with a 10–8 record and again lost in a nailbiter to an excellent team, the 13-5 veteran, Cliff Stoudt/Joe Cribbs/Jim Smith-led Birmingham Stallions, 22–20.

As it turned out, that would be the last game the Gamblers would ever play.  While the Gamblers had been a solid draw the year before, area fans were not about to abandon the Houston Oilers.  Attendance dropped by almost 9,000 from 1984.  The resulting financial problems were so severe that at one point, the Gamblers had trouble making payroll.  They needed an advance from the league just to go to the playoffs. Although owner Jerry Argovitz had ultimately supported moving to the fall, he and his partners knew they could not even begin to compete with the Oilers and decided to get out.

After briefly entertaining an offer to move to New York City, they agreed to sell controlling interest to real estate magnate and future Miami Dolphins owner Stephen Ross. Just days later, Ross announced he was merging the Gamblers with the New Jersey Generals. Although the Generals were the surviving team, Ross would be a full partner with Generals owner Donald Trump, and Argovitz became the merged team's president. However, Ross backed out of the merger after discovering the Gamblers' debt load was larger than he anticipated. Trump reimbursed Ross for his interest and became sole owner. However, Trump retained the Gamblers' player contracts, so the deal was still widely reported as a merger. Trump immediately hired Pardee as coach.  With an offense boasting Kelly and Walker, observers dubbed the new Generals the USFL's "dream team." Kelly was even featured on the cover of Sports Illustrated in a Generals uniform. That season however would never be played.

The most notable players on the team were Kelly, future Washington Redskins wide receiver Ricky Sanders, future Detroit Lions wide receiver Richard Johnson, future Indianapolis Colts kick returner Clarence Verdin, and future Cleveland Browns wide receiver Gerald McNeil.  Todd Fowler, the featured running back on the team, was also notable as the first USFL player the rival NFL signed away from the league in 1985 (by the Dallas Cowboys).

Giant dice game

The Gamblers were well known for a 7-11 promotion in which two huge dice were dropped onto the field from the roof of the Astrodome.

1984 schedule and results

Sources

1985 schedule and results

Sources

Single-season leaders
 Rushing Yards: 1009 (1984), Todd Fowler
 Receiving Yards: 1445 (1984), Richard Johnson
 Passing Yards: 5219 (1984), Jim Kelly (also league record)

Season-by-season results

|-
! 1984
| 13 || 5 || 0 || 1st in Western || Lost in Quarterfinals (Arizona)
|-
! 1985
| 10 || 8 || 0 || 3rd in Western || Lost in Quarterfinals (Birmingham)
|-
! Totals || 23 || 15 || 0 || ||

References

External links
 USFL.info - Houston Gamblers
houston-gamblers.com Warehouse of Gambler materials.

 
1983 establishments in Texas
1985 disestablishments in Texas